Judge Pratt may refer to:

Charles Pratt, 1st Earl Camden (1714–1794), judge of the Court of Chancery for England and Wales
George C. Pratt (born 1928), judge of the United States Court of Appeals for the Second Circuit
John H. Pratt (1910–1995), judge of the United States District Court for the District of Columbia
Philip Pratt (1924–1989), judge of the United States District Court for the Eastern District of Michigan
Ralph Pratt (born 1940), judge of the Pennsylvania Courts of Common Pleas
Robert W. Pratt (born 1947), judge of the United States District Court for the Southern District of Iowa
Tanya Walton Pratt (born 1959), judge of the United States District Court for the Southern District of Indiana

See also
Justice Pratt (disambiguation)